The Central Bank of Liberia is Liberia's central bank. Its current executive governor is J. Aloysius Tarlue. The offices of the bank are located in Monrovia, the capital of Liberia.

The bank is a member of the Alliance for Financial Inclusion.

History
From 1974 to 2000, Liberia's central bank was the National Bank of Liberia. The Central Bank of Liberia, known as "CBL", was founded on October 18, 1999 by an act of the Liberian legislature, and began operations in the year 2000, at which time the National Bank of Liberia, or "NBL", was dissolved.

Governors of National Bank of Liberia
Thomas D. Voer Hanson, 1980 - 1986
John G. Bestman, 1986 - 1987
Paul Jeffy, 1987 - 1988
Thomas D. Voer Hanson, 1988 - 1989
David K. Vinton, ? - 1990 - 1994 - ?
Raleigh Seekie, ? - 1996
Ignatius Clay, 1996 - 1997
Charles Bright, 1997 - 2000

Governors of Central Bank of Liberia
 Elie E. Saleeby, 2000 - May 2004, the first executive governor
 Charles A. Greene, May 2004 - 2006
 Joseph Mills Jones, 2006 - February 2016
 Charles Sirleaf, February 2016 - April 2016
 Milton Alvin Weeks, April 2016 - 2018
 Nathaniel R. Patray, 2018 - November 2019
 J. Aloysius Tarlue, November 2019 -

See also

Economy of Liberia
Liberian dollar
List of banks in Liberia
List of central banks of Africa

References

External links
Central Bank of Liberia official site

Banks of Liberia
Economy of Liberia
Government of Liberia
Liberia
Economy of Monrovia
1999 establishments in Liberia
Banks established in 1999